Dongzhi County is a county in the south of Anhui province, situated on the southeast (right) bank of the Yangtze and bordering Jiangxi province to the south. It is under the jurisdiction of the prefecture-level city of Chizhou and occupies its southwest corner. The government of Dongzhi County is located in Yaodu Town.

In paleontology, it is known for its Hualong Cave from which important human and animal fossils have been discovered, including Homo erectus (dubbed Dongzhi Man) and a 300,000-year-old archaic human (Homo sapiens).

Administrative divisions
Dongzhi County has jurisdiction over 11 towns and 3 townships.

Towns:

– Former Towns:
Shengli

Townships:
Muta Township
Huayuanli Township
Qingshan Township

Climate

Tourist attractions
The village of Nanxiguzhai nestled deep in the midst of hills is well known to be the descendants of a Xiongnu tribe.A ticket priced at RMB45 can be purchased.

Transport
Dongzhi is served by the Tongling–Jiujiang Railway.

References

County-level divisions of Anhui
Chizhou